King's Quest VI: Heir Today, Gone Tomorrow is a point-and-click adventure game, first released in 1992 as the sixth installment in the King's Quest series produced by Sierra On-Line. Written by Roberta Williams and Jane Jensen, King's Quest VI is widely recognized as the high point in the series for its landmark 3D graphic introduction movie (created by Kronos Digital Entertainment) and professional voice acting (Hollywood actor Robby Benson provided the voice for Prince Alexander, the game's protagonist). King's Quest VI was programmed in Sierra's Creative Interpreter and was the last King's Quest game to be released on floppy disk. A CD-ROM version of the game was released in 1993, including more character voices, a slightly different opening movie and more detailed artwork and animation.

The name of this sequel is a pun on the common phrase "here today, gone tomorrow". This pun is related to the abrupt departure of Prince Alexander after the events of King's Quest V, where he was just rescued by King Graham along with Princess Cassima, who asked Alexander to come visit her at the end of that game.

Gameplay

King's Quest VI is a 2D graphic adventure game with a point-and-click interface. The player is given an icon-based toolbar at the top of the screen of selectable functions: walk, look (provides a description from the narrator of the object targeted), action and talk, respectively. It also includes the item inventory (the last selected item can be picked right away) and a game options menu. This is the second game in the series to feature this interface, which was introduced in its immediate predecessor King's Quest V as a new feature of the SCI1 version of Sierra's Creative Interpreter engine; previous titles in the series featured a text parser where players had to type commands and actions instead of selecting them on the screen.

Gameplay involves solving puzzles. Those include logic puzzles and interacting with characters either by dialogue or usage of collected items. One of the puzzles requires consulting the booklet "Guidebook to the Land of the Green Isles", which is included in the game's package. Aside from providing additional background to the game's setting, this booklet serves as part of the game's copy-protection. The player will not be able to pass the puzzles on the Cliffs of Logic that guard the Isle of the Sacred Mountain without information from the booklet. The booklet also includes a poem encoding the solution to one of the puzzles in the labyrinth on the island. In the re-released edition, the guide is part of the manual released on the game CD.

Solving the puzzles in the game usually requires traveling between the islands that make up the game world, which is accomplished by means of a magic map. Although a magic map had been used in earlier games of the series such as King's Quest III, its implementation in King's Quest VI was different from earlier games in that it was only used for travel between islands, which could not be reached using the walking interface.

Plot
The game takes place almost entirely in a fictional kingdom called the Land of the Green Isles. The kingdom comprises several islands, and is described as being largely isolated from the outside world. The player can travel between different islands after obtaining a magic map.

The center of the kingdom is the Isle of the Crown, which has an Arabian Nights theme. The Isle of Wonder is inspired by Alice in Wonderland, and the Isle of the Sacred Mountain is inspired by Classical mythology. The Isle of the Beast, inspired by Beauty and the Beast, is heavily forested and scattered with magical barriers. There also are additional hidden areas. One of these is inhabited by a tribe of druids, while another gives the player the option to confront Death.

The game's opening cutscene shows Prince Alexander is haunted by memories of Princess Cassima, whom he met at the end of King's Quest V when they were both rescued from the wizard Mordack. After seeing a vision of Cassima in the magical mirror that his father acquired in the first King's Quest, he sails to find her. At the beginning of the game he is shipwrecked on the shore of the Isle of the Crown, where he learns that the vizier Abdul Alhazred (named after the author of the fictional Necronomicon) has assumed control in Cassima's absence, and plans to force her to marry him. Alexander must explore the Land of the Green Isles in order to find and learn what he needs to rescue Cassima from the vizier.

Multiple endings
A significant aspect of the story and gameplay is the option for the player to receive different endings based on choices made during the course of the game. Partway through the game, the player has the option to pursue either the short path, or the long path with more puzzles and a more satisfying ending. Upon completing either path, the player is given a clue about what choices would have led to the other ending. Endings contain many minor variables based on optional tasks. Almost half of the game's quests are optional, many have multiple solutions, and the open world design allows players to choose the order.

Development

King's Quest creator and designer Roberta Williams first met with Sierra newcomer and co-designer Jane Jensen (who would go on to create the Gabriel Knight series) in May 1991 to discuss the design for the upcoming sixth title in the series. Williams began preliminary work on King's Quest VI in June, "laying out the basic story" and worked alongside Jensen throughout July and August on coming up with design ideas; after five months, Williams and Jensen finished the documentation for the design. Two key goals of the writers were to keep the game's tone consistent with its predecessors' while still making it a distinct title, and to make players connect emotionally with the game; Williams wrote the love story of Prince Alexander and Cassima specifically for this emotional attachment.

Storyboards and character sketches were created by co-director and project manager Bill Skirvin and the artist team. John Shroades sketched 80 background paintings. Motion capture transcribed the movement of real-life actors shot on video to the more than 2000 character actions on computer. Williams and Skirvin chose the actors and costumes for the shootings, and Michael Hutchinson led the animation team that integrated the footage into Shroades's backgrounds. Chris Braymen composed the MIDI music and produced the sound effects. The 3D-animated introduction was produced by Stanley Liu of Kronos Digital Entertainment, a company that did special effects for such films as Batman Returns and The Lawnmower Man. This sequence is present with different edits and narrations in each of the DOS, Windows, Amiga, and Macintosh versions.

Jensen scripted the game, defining for programmers the game's responses for the player's actions and the more than 6000 lines of written messages. Robert Lindsley served as the game's lead programmer. The game was coded on an updated version of the proprietary Sierra Creative Interpreter engine named "SCI1". Robin Bradley served as the quality assurance tester; throughout July 1992 the game went through constant testing. Development wrapped in September, when Sierra's marketing and distribution departments began promoting and releasing the game.

King's Quest VI was initially scheduled for release in September 1992, then delayed until mid-October. It was then shipped on October 6 and launched on October 13 on nine floppy disks for DOS and Macintosh. The Amiga version was ported by Revolution Software. Sierra, which itself converted its games for the Amiga prior to King's Quest VI, announced in early 1993 that it would cease releasing games for the platform; however, Revolution co-founder Charles Cecil offered his company to make the Amiga conversion instead. The port began development in March 1993 and was released for the Amiga in December. It uses Revolution's Virtual Theatre engine instead of SCI1 due to better performance on the platform.

A CD-ROM version of King's Quest VI, released in 1993 for DOS and Microsoft Windows, features an extended version of the opening sequence, a full voiceover of every line of text in the game, and a revised soundtrack with a full version of the ballad "Girl in the Tower". The song was composed by Mark Seibert with lyrics by Jane Jensen and serves as the game's love theme, playing in the end credits. Sierra sent a CD with the song to various radio stations and bundled with the game a pamphlet listing these stations and suggested fans to call them and ask for the song to be played. This resulted in Sierra receiving legal threats from stations bothered by excessive requests from listeners. Sierra co-founder Ken Williams responded to the stations by jokingly stating that the stations "were the criminals for ignoring their customers — something I believe no business should ever do". The Windows version includes higher resolution character portraits in dialogue sequences.

Emmy-winning director Stuart M. Rosen directed the voice cast of King's Quest VI for the CD-ROM version, which includes actor Robby Benson (voice of the Beast in Disney's Beauty and the Beast), who voiced Prince Alexander. Five additional people to the game's team were involved in the development of the CD-ROM version.

The second King's Quest Collection has a number of editions in which the CD with King's Quest VI do not include the "Girl in the Tower" theme song audio CD track, so the Windows version simply crash during the credits and the DOS version plays the credits with no music. The King's Quest Collection release by Vivendi in 2006 includes the Windows version of the game, but is set up to run the MS-DOS version with text and speech in DOSBox.

Release

Sales
According to Ken Williams, about 400,000 copies of King's Quest VI were sold in its first week of release and it topped sales charts for DOS games upon release in September 1992, still holding the number one position in December that year. The CD-ROM version was the 5th best-selling CD-ROM game in November 1993. According to Sierra On-Line, combined sales of the King's Quest series surpassed 3.8 million units by the end of March 1996. By November 2000, PC Data reported that King's Quest VIs sales in the United States alone had reached between 300,000 and 400,000 units.

Critical reception

Dragon gave the game 5 out of 5 stars, calling it "one of the best adventure games on the market" and writing that it has "enormous replay value". Chuck Miller of Computer Gaming World stated that the number and quality of puzzles made King's Quest VI the first Sierra adventure in which he did not miss the older games' text parser. The magazine stated that while the graphic and sound were as good as other Sierra games, the animation was especially lifelike. It concluded that the game was "the best of the King's Quest games to come out of Daventry, and Sierra's finest adventure to date ... [it] has all the signs of becoming a classic". PC Format magazine was less positive, giving the game a score of 72%. It liked the lushly drawn graphics and pleasing sound, but disliked the game for overuse of sudden death and being too limiting. Barry Brenesal of PC Magazine wrote: "King's Quests latest sequel may be more of the same, but that's no cause for concern. A formula that's rooted in the likes of Charles Perrault and the Brothers Grimm needs no excuse for its theme. And with Sierra at the design helm, it also needs no apology for its treatment". Electronic Games''' reviewer Russ Ceccola wrote that the game "will fully satisfy fans of the series, inspiring them to a higher level of creativity with its almost-hidden sections and plot elements" and named it the "finest" installment in the series. Writing for Compute!, Scott A. May said the game balances the story to attract all audiences and wrote that "those who love action will find plenty to pump their adrenaline, yet they won't be put off by the game's gentle, romantic side". Just Adventure reviewer Adam Rodman gave the game an A.

When reviewing the CD-ROM version, Computer Gaming Worlds Charles Ardai compared the game and series to "vanilla ice cream", but praised the "incomparable" graphics and stated that the voice acting was "much stronger" than in the previous game. He concluded that "King's Quest VI is a heartily inoffensive game full of light touches and not a great deal else"; however, "for plain vanilla, King's Quest VI on CD-ROM is about as good as it gets". Ardai later described the game as "best-selling though somewhat vapid ... adventures of Prince Pubescent in the Land of Cute". In April 1994 the magazine said that the CD version's "quality voice talent throughout ... audibly displays that Sierra learned from their previous error", and "a worthy heir to the King's Quest lineage". Writing for CD-ROM Today, Neil Randall praised the CD version's addition of voice acting and the voices themselves, but expressed disappointment that it doesn't improve the game's graphical details.CU Amiga gave a positive review of the Amiga version of the game, singling out praise for the mouse control interface, the graphics, characters and the conversion from PC done by Revolution, and gave it an 89% score. In an A−
review, Peter Olafson of Amiga World equally praised Revolution's conversion and also commended the story. Amiga Power reviewer Jonathan Davies was less enthusiastic, comparing it unfavorably with other contemporary point-and-click games in terms of innovation, and rated it 70%; Amiga Format's Dave Golder gave a similar assessment and rated it 69%.

In retrospective reviews made in the late 2000s, Allgame gave both the PC CD-ROM and Macintosh adaptations 2½ stars out of five, while Adventure Gamers gave the game 4½ stars out of 5. King's Quest VI is generally considered the best title in the series and is mentioned as one of the greatest games of all time. King's Quest VI was inducted into GameSpot's list of the greatest games of all time, and PC Gamer US named it the 48th best computer game ever in 1994. Adventure Gamers named it the 3rd best adventure game of all time, GamesRadar placed it as the 5th best point-and-click adventure game in 2012, and Kotaku included it in its list of the 10 adventure games "everyone must play". In 2011, Adventure Gamers named King's Quest VI the 13th-best adventure game ever released.

See alsoMysterioso Pizzicato''

References

Bibliography

External links

King's Quest VI Technical Help on the Sierra Help Pages

1992 video games
Adventure games
Amiga games
DOS games
Classic Mac OS games
Windows games
King's Quest
Point-and-click adventure games
ScummVM-supported games
Sierra Entertainment games
Video games with alternate endings
Games commercially released with DOSBox
Video games developed in the United States